The 1980–81 Tercera División season was the 4th season since establishment as the 4th tier.

League tables

Group I

Group II

Group III

Group IV

Group V

Group VI

Group VII

Group VIII

Group IX

Group X

Group XI

Group XII

Group XIII

Promotion playoff

First round

Final Round

Season records
 Most wins: 28, Real Valladolid Promesas and Poblense.
 Most draws: 16, Lagun Onak, Bergara and Santomera.
 Most losses: 30, Toledo.
 Most goals for: 97, Real Valladolid Promesas.
 Most goals against: 99, Loja.
 Most points: 64, Real Valladolid Promesas.
 Fewest wins: 2, Toledo.
 Fewest draws: 3, Ponferradina.
 Fewest losses: 2, Poblense.
 Fewest goals for: 21, Toledo.
 Fewest goals against: 16, Poblense.
 Fewest points: 10, Toledo.

External links
www.rsssf.com
www.futbolme.com

Tercera División seasons
4
Spain